Zanata may refer to:

 Zanata or Zenata, group of Berber tribes which, in antiquity, inhabited an area stretching from west of Egypt to Morocco with the Sanhaja and Masmud
 Zanata Stone, small stele with engravings
 Carlos Alberto Zanata Amato, Brazilian association football defensive midfielder
 Giuseppe Zanata, Italian painter of the Baroque period
 Rita de Cássia Peres Teixeira Zanata, Brazilian volleyball player
 Zanata, web-based translation software

See also 

 Zanatta, a surname